Spenceville is a former settlement in Nevada County, California. Along with Hacketville and Wilsonville, Spenceville was established southwest of Rough and Ready during the 1865-1866 copper mining boom.

Demographics
In 1880, its population was 350. By the 1920s, the population had dropped to approximately 150.

History
The Spenceville post office operated during the period of 1872 through 1932.

During World War II, Spenceville was used as a military training area by Camp Beale.

See also
 Spenceville Wildlife Area

References

External links
 Spenceville Wildlife Refuge & Shingle Falls:  Wildlife Preserve
 Photos, undated, Gold Rush Towns of Nevada County, p. 86

Former settlements in Nevada County, California
Former populated places in California